Patrik Ligetvári (born 13 February 1996) is a Hungarian handball player for Telekom Veszprém and the Hungarian national team.

He represented Hungary at the 2019 World Men's Handball Championship.

Honours

National team
 Youth European Championship:
 : 2014

Individual
 Hungarian Adolescent Handballer of the Year: 2013
 The Best Defensive Player of the Youth European Championship: 2014

References

External links

Oregfiuk.hu
Handballveszprem.hu

1996 births
Living people
Hungarian male handball players
People from Várpalota
Veszprém KC players
CB Ademar León players
Expatriate handball players
Hungarian expatriate sportspeople in Spain
Liga ASOBAL players
Sportspeople from Veszprém County